Kevin Hardee (born April 9, 1965) is an American politician who has served in the South Carolina House of Representatives from the 105th district since 2012.

References

1965 births
Living people
Republican Party members of the South Carolina House of Representatives
21st-century American politicians